Southern Indian Lake is a large lake in northern Manitoba, Canada.
 
Southern Indian Lake is the fourth largest lake in Manitoba. It has a complex shoreline with many islands, long peninsulas and deep bays. The Churchill River flows through the lake.

It had a population of 767 in 2011 and is the main settlement of the O-Pipon-Na-Piwin Cree Nation, a First Nations band government.

Southern Indian Lake is on the Fidler map of 1814.

The lake and the settlement are accessed by the South Indian Lake Airport and Manitoba Provincial Road 493 (Pr493).

Churchill River Diversion

The Churchill River Diversion of the Nelson River Hydroelectric Project diverts part of the Churchill River at Missi Falls, the natural outflow of Southern Indian Lake, south into the Rat River branch of the Burntwood River. The control dam at Missi Falls (Missi Falls Control Structure) raised the lake level 3 metres. An artificial outflow channel (South Bay Diversion Channel) was also created from  South Bay of Southern Indian Lake to Issett Lake. The dam at Notigi (Notigi Control Structure) on the Rat River controls the flow to the Nelson River system.

See also
List of lakes of Manitoba

References

External links
The Canadian Encyclopedia (Southern Indian Lake)
The Manitoba Historical Society (Native People and Hydroelectric Development in Northern Manitoba, 1957-1987: The Promise and the Reality)
Mennonite Central Committee (Churchill River Diversion)

Lakes of Northern Manitoba